Erwin Chemerinsky (born May 14, 1953) is an American legal scholar known for his studies of United States constitutional law and federal civil procedure. Since 2017, Chemerinsky has been the dean of the UC Berkeley School of Law. Previously, he also served as the inaugural dean of the University of California, Irvine School of Law from 2008 to 2017.

A study of legal publications between 2016 and 2020 found Chemerinsky to be the most frequently cited American legal scholar. Chemerinsky was named a fellow of the American Academy of Arts and Sciences in 2016.  The National Jurist magazine named him the most influential person in legal education in the United States in 2017.  In 2021 Chemerinsky was named President-elect of the Association of American Law Schools.

Early life and education

Chemerinsky was born in 1953 in Chicago, Illinois. He grew up in a working-class Jewish family on Chicago's South Side and attended the University of Chicago Laboratory Schools for high school. He studied communications at Northwestern University, where he competed on the debate team. He graduated in 1975 with a Bachelor of Arts with highest honors. Chemerinsky then attended Harvard Law School, where he was a member of the Harvard Legal Aid Bureau. He graduated with a Juris Doctor, cum laude, in 1978.

Professional career 
After law school, Chemerinsky worked as an honors attorney in the U.S. Department of Justice's Civil Division from 1978 to 1979, then entered private practice at the Washington, D.C. law firm Dobrovir, Oakes & Gebhardt. In 1980, Chemerinsky was hired as an assistant professor of law at DePaul University College of Law. He moved to the Gould School of Law at the University of Southern California (USC) in 1983. Chemerinsky taught at USC from 1983 to 2004, then joined the faculty of Duke University School of Law.

In 2008, Chemerinsky was named the inaugural dean of the newly established University of California, Irvine School of Law. In 2017, he became dean of the UC Berkeley School of Law, where he is also the Jesse H. Choper Distinguished Professor of Law.

Chemerinsky has published eleven books (three of which have been printed in multiple editions) and over 200 law review articles. He also writes a regular column for the Sacramento Bee and a monthly column for the ABA Journal and Los Angeles Daily Journal, and frequently pens op-eds for prominent newspapers across the country. Chemerinsky has also argued several cases at the United States Supreme Court, including United States v. Apel, Scheidler v. National Organization for Women. Lockyer v. Andrade. and Van Orden v. Perry, and has written numerous amicus briefs.

In 2011, National Jurist magazine described Chemerinsky one of the "23 Law Profs to Take Before You Die".

Other notable work includes:
Los Angeles Police Department panel reviewing the Rampart Scandal.
Los Angeles commission reviewing irregularities in city contracting.
Helped write the Los Angeles city charter.
 In 1995, was a commentator on the O. J. Simpson trial on KCBS-TV, KNX, and CBS News.
Helped draft the Constitution of Belarus.
Helped found the Progressive Jewish Alliance.
National Advisory Board Co-Chair of the UC Free Speech Center. 
Named to Los Angeles District Attorney George Gascón's transition team in 2020.
Chosen as the 2021-2022 President of the Association of American Law Schools.

Legal thought
Chemerinsky supports gun control and disagreed with the decision in District of Columbia v. Heller. He thinks that even if an individual's right to bear arms exists, the District of Columbia was justified in restricting that right because it believed that the law would lessen violence. George Will specifically mentioned and responded to Chemerinsky's argument in a column that ran four days later.

Chemerinsky believes that Roe v. Wade was correctly decided. He says, "Judicial activism is the label for the decision that people don't like." He also believed that gay marriage should be legal many years prior to the decision in Obergefell v. Hodges.

Chemerinsky also represents a client held at the Guantanamo Bay detention center. He supports affirmative action. In January 2017, Chemerinsky, along with other high-profile lawyers, sued President Donald Trump for refusing to "divest from his businesses".

In an opinion piece following the 2020 presidential election, Chemerinsky wrote that "the Electoral College makes no sense as a way for a democracy to choose a president." He writes that it was intentionally designed to be anti-democratic and came about as part of "compromises concerning slavery that were at the core of the Constitution's drafting and ratification."

In a New York Times op-ed in August 2021, Chemerinsky argued that California's recall process is unconstitutional.  Chemerinsky wrote, "[The court] could simply add Mr. Newsom’s name on the ballot to the list of those running to replace him. That simple change would treat his supporters equally to others and ensure that if he gets more votes than any other candidate, he will stay in office".

Freedom of speech 

In 2010, students who were protesting against UCI's invitation of Israeli Ambassador Michael Oren interrupted his speech several times. Chemerinsky, referring to the heckler's veto, asserted that their protest was a form of punishable civil disobedience and not protected by the First Amendment. However, he also strongly criticized the prosecutors' decision to file criminal charges against the students.

Appointment controversy
Chemerinsky's hiring as dean of the UCI School of Law was controversial. After signing a contract on September 4, 2007, the hire was rescinded by UCI Chancellor Michael V. Drake, who felt the law professor's commentaries were "polarizing." Drake claimed the decision was his own and not the subject of any outside influence.

The action was criticized by both liberal and conservative scholars, who felt it hindered the academic mission of the law school and violated principles of academic freedom, and few believed Drake's claims that it was not the result of outside influence. The issue was the subject of an editorial in The New York Times on Friday, September 14. Details emerged revealing that the university had received criticism on the hire from the California Supreme Court's Chief Justice Ronald M. George, who criticized Chemerinsky's grasp of death penalty appeals and a group of prominent local Republicans, including Los Angeles County Supervisor Michael D. Antonovich, who wanted to stop the appointment. Drake traveled over a weekend to meet with Chemerinsky in Durham, North Carolina, where he was a professor at the Duke University School of Law at the time, and the two reached an agreement late Sunday evening.

On September 17, Chemerinsky issued a joint press release with Drake indicating that Chemerinsky would head the law school. The release stated that the chancellor was "commit[ted] to academic freedom."  On September 20, 2007, Chemerinsky's hire was formally approved by the Regents of the University of California.

Personal life 
Chemerinsky was first married to Marcy Strauss, a professor at Loyola Law School.  They had two sons, Jeffrey and Adam, before divorcing in 1992.

Chemerinsky is currently married to Catherine Fisk, the Barbara Nachtrieb Armstrong Professor of Law at UC Berkeley School of Law.  They have a son, Alex, and a daughter, Mara.

Selected works

——— (1989a).  Federal Jurisdiction.  Boston: Little, Brown & Co.; 2nd edition (1994); 3rd edition (1999); 4th edition (2003), Aspen Publishers; 5th edition (2007); 6th edition (2012), Wolters Kluwer; 7th edition (2016).

——— (1997b).  Constitutional Law: Principles and Policies.  New York: Aspen Law and Business; 2nd edition (2002); 3rd edition (2006); 4th edition (2011); 5th edition (2015), Wolters Kluwer.

——— (2005).  Constitutional Law (2nd edition).  New York: Aspen Publishers; 3rd edition (2009); 4th edition (2013); 5th edition (2017).

——— (2014). The Case Against the Supreme Court. New York: Viking; (2015), New York: Penguin Books.
——— (2018). We the People: A Progressive Reading of the Constitution for the Twenty-First Century. New York: Picador. .

References

Citations

Sources

External links
Duke University School of Law biography
University of Southern California Law School biography
UCI Faculty
BerkeleyLaw Faculty

American legal scholars
American scholars of constitutional law
Deans of law schools in the United States
Deans of UC Berkeley School of Law
USC Gould School of Law faculty
Duke University School of Law faculty
DePaul University faculty
Guantanamo Bay attorneys
Harvard Law School alumni
Northwestern University School of Communication alumni
University of Chicago Laboratory Schools alumni
20th-century American educators
21st-century American educators
Jewish American academics
Educators from Greater Los Angeles
People from Irvine, California
1953 births
Living people